James Preston may refer to:
James H. Preston (1860–1938), mayor of Baltimore
James Moore Preston (1873–1962), American painter and illustrator
James Patton Preston (1774–1843), U.S. political figure
James Preston (cricketer) (1792–1842), English cricketer
James B. Preston (politician) (died 1902), American politician
James B. Preston (1926–2004), American neurophysiologist

See also 
Jimmy Preston (1913–1984), R&B bandleader